Seein' Things is a 1924 American short silent comedy film directed by Robert F. McGowan. It was the 24th Our Gang short subject released.

Plot
Farina has nightmares after ruining the gang's barbecue and then gorging herself on several fried chickens.

Cast

The Gang
 Joe Cobb as Joe
 Jackie Condon as Jackie
 Mickey Daniels as Mickey
 Allen Hoskins as Farina
 Mary Kornman as Mary
 Ernie Morrison as Sunshine Sammy
 Andy Samuel as Andy

Additional cast
 Dorothy Morrison as girl in dream
 Joseph Morrison as 'Two-Razor' Johnson
 S. D. Wilcox as police officer

Production notes
When the silent Pathé Our Gang comedies were syndicated for television as "The Mischief Makers" in 1960, Seein' Things was retitled A Crazy Dream. Two-thirds of the original film was included.

Before the dream sequence, Farina is dressed as a girl. During the dream sequence, he is a boy.

With Jack Davis' departure from the cast, Andy Samuel begins to make more appearances in Our Gang.

Ernie Morrison’s sister, Dorothy Morrison, makes a brief appearance in this film.

See also
 Our Gang filmography

References

External links

1924 films
American silent short films
American black-and-white films
1924 comedy films
Films directed by Robert F. McGowan
Hal Roach Studios short films
Our Gang films
1924 short films
1920s American films
Silent American comedy films
1920s English-language films